Kalatu (also Romanized as Kalātū) is a village in Dezhgan Rural District, in the Central District of Bandar Lengeh County, Hormozgan Province, Iran. At the 2006 census, its population was 108, in 21 families.

References 

Populated places in Bandar Lengeh County